Hwanghaeicola is a Gram-negative and strictly aerobic genus of bacteria from the family of Rhodobacteraceae with one known species (Hwanghaeicola aestuarii).Hwanghaeicola aestuarii has been isolated from the tidal flat sediments from the coast of Taean in Korea.

References

Rhodobacteraceae
Bacteria genera
Monotypic bacteria genera